Glove fetishism is a form of sexual fetishism relating to gloves, referring to sexual preoccupation with gloves of various kinds. Persons with this fetish find the gloves themselves arouse sexual feelings, whether visualised, worn by themselves or when worn or held by someone else, and in particular by a partner. In some cases, the fetish is enhanced by the material of the glove (e.g.,leather, cotton, latex, nitrile, PVC, satin or nylon). Often, the actions of a gloved hand are as arousing as the glove itself, because the glove provides a second skin, or in other words a fetishistic surrogate for the wearer's own skin. Medical gloves and rubber gloves provide a safer sex environment. Subtle movements by the gloved fingers or the hand as a whole can provide the individual with an visual stimulus and sexual arousal. The act of putting gloves on, or slipping them off the hands, can also be a source of glove fetish fantasy and delight. Smell may also be a factor, in particular when it comes to latex or rubber, as can be the sound of latex or with leather gloves, where the distinct odour can enhance the fetishistic experience. Glove fetishism may also coexist with hand fetishism. Many glove fetishists build a collection of gloves and take pleasure in buying gloves over the counter or online. Receiving parcels containing internet purchased gloves may provide an extra-special frisson for the glove fetishist.

Gloves are also used for fisting and sounding. They are also a frequent component of costumes worn by superheroes or superheroines and exposure to such at an early age may be developmentally influential. Gloves also figure prominently in cosplay scenes, music videos, films and are a staple accessory in any crime fetish. 

Most glove fetishists prefer full-fingered, tight and shiny gloves, but there is a wide diversity of penchants, which span various materials, colours, lengths (including fingerless or not) and capacity for shine or polishing materials that enhance the final appearance. One type of material or glove length may dominate, but over time the glove fetishist may develop multiple favourites. 

It is a fetish that crosses gender and sexuality stereotypes, needing no anchor to one or to the other. Males appear to adopt sexual fetishes in general, much more often than do females or perhaps non-binary persons and with respect to glove fetishism, this is no less true. The prevalence of glove fetishism in the general population is currently unknown. Further research is needed to provide conclusive demographic data. Within the context of fetish clothing as a whole, glove fetishists appear to make up a relatively small portion of the community, although the exact size of the glove fetish sect remains unclear. Whether ethnicity or cultural factors influence this frequency is unknown. At what age it becomes apparent is also poorly understood, but older glove fetishists can recall interest in or fascination with gloves prior to puberty, which is backed up by comments on social media, so it may manifest in some form at quite a young age and possibly only take on sexual connotations as a child matures into adolescence. Psychologists and psychiatrists appear to identify onset mostly around puberty. How enduring glove fetishism may be is largely undocumented, however it would appear to persist well into late life. There are no reports of it disappearing spontaneously in the long term.

Medical glove fetishism involves thin latex gloves, which come in many different types. Personal preference ranges from color, smell, size, texture, smoothness, powdered, or un-powdered. Fetishists are proud of their collection of medical gloves, as well as rubber gloves.

There is a fetish called GOM which stands for 'Glove Over Mouth' where a gloved hand is placed firmly over ones mouth and/or nose and is sometimes associated with breath control. This can be arousing to the giver and/or the receiver.

Some glove fetishists prefer particular glove lengths, for example the long opera-style or gloves that cup the elbow or short cuff length. The shoulder or opera length glove appears to be especially popular, perhaps channeling the burlesque glove length or that popularised in the raunchy cartoons that appeared in the mid-20th century, such as those of Bill Ward. Some prefer gloves as part of an outfit, such as a nurse, policewoman or French maid uniform.  Others, who are of a sexually submissive nature are stimulated when their dominant partner wears gloves.  Dominant partners may likewise prefer that their submissives wear gloves.  As with all fetishes however, there need not be a BDSM connection to an affinity for gloves.

Apart from enjoying their appearance, glove fetishists often like to wear gloves themselves, both during sexual encounters and also at other times. Most glove fetishists strongly desire that their sexual partner wear their favourite gloves, since this stimulates arousal and heightens their sexual gratification, both perceptually and in practice. The gloves most commonly used in this context are made of nylon or nylon combined with elasticised fabrics, so as to provide a "one-size-fits-all" glove with a satin finish for example. Other preferred gloves include leather and latex or nitrile (such as those doctors or nurses use for examination) or those worn at rubber fetish parties. Shoulder length black latex gloves or leather gloves are especially popular. Some prefer the household rubber glove as mentioned above. The appeal of the household glove may relate to the diverse colour range or perhaps the greater thickness of the rubber or simply their affordability and accessibility in the home and at nearby stores. Many enjoy erotic spanking with gloves donned by the provider as this offers a different feeling and sound for the "spankee", which can be a large part of the fetish.

See also
 Charles Guyette
 Eric Stanton
 Gene Bilbrew
 Irving Klaw
 John Willie
 Cosplay
 Boot fetishism
 Fetish fashion
 Hentai
 PVC clothing
 Sexual fetishism
 Shoe fetishism
 Underwear fetishism
 Uniform fetishism

References
 Copied from the Informed Consent BDSM Dictionary  under GFDL.
 Neil Frude, "Understanding abnormal psychology", Basic psychology, Wiley-Blackwell, 1998, p. 248
 James Melvin Reinhardt, "Sex perversions and sex crimes", Police science series, C.C. Thomas, 1957, pp. 128,242-246

Gloves
Paraphilias